Rhizobium is a genus of Gram-negative soil bacteria that fix nitrogen. Rhizobium species form an endosymbiotic nitrogen-fixing association with roots of (primarily) legumes and other flowering plants.

The bacteria colonize plant cells within root nodules, where they convert atmospheric nitrogen into ammonia using the enzyme nitrogenase and then provide organic nitrogenous compounds such as glutamine or ureides to the plant.  The plant, in turn, provides the bacteria with organic compounds made by photosynthesis. This mutually beneficial relationship is true of all of the rhizobia, of which the genus Rhizobium is a typical example. Rhizobium is also capable to solubilize phosphorus.

History
Martinus Beijerinck was the first to isolate and cultivate a microorganism from the nodules of legumes in 1888. He named it Bacillus radicicola, which is now placed in Bergey's Manual of Determinative Bacteriology under the genus Rhizobium.

Research
Rhizobium forms a symbiotic relationship with certain plants such as legumes, fixing nitrogen from the air into ammonia, which acts as a natural fertilizer for the plants. Current research is being conducted by Agricultural Research Service microbiologists to discover a way to use Rhizobium’s biological nitrogen fixation. This research involves the genetic mapping of various rhizobial species with their respective symbiotic plant species, like alfalfa or soybean. The goal of this research is to increase the plants’ productivity without using fertilizers.

In molecular biology, Rhizobium has also been identified as a contaminant of DNA extraction kit reagents and ultrapure water systems, which may lead to its erroneous appearance in microbiota or metagenomic datasets. The presence of nitrogen-fixing bacteria as contaminants may be due to the use of nitrogen gas in ultra-pure water production to inhibit microbial growth in storage tanks.

Species
The genus Rhizobium comprises the following species:

 Rhizobium acidisoli Román-Ponce et al. 2016
 Rhizobium aegyptiacum Shamseldin et al. 2016
 Rhizobium aethiopicum Aserse et al. 2017

 Rhizobium alamii Berge et al. 2009
 "Rhizobium album" Hang et al. 2019
 "Rhizobium albus" Li et al. 2017

 Rhizobium altiplani Baraúna et al. 2016
 Rhizobium alvei Sheu et al. 2015
 Rhizobium anhuiense Zhang et al. 2015
 Rhizobium aquaticum Máthé et al. 2019
 "Rhizobium arachis" Wang et al. 2001
 Rhizobium arenae Zhang et al. 2017
 Rhizobium arsenicireducens Mohapatra et al. 2020

 Rhizobium azooxidifex Behrendt et al. 2016
 Rhizobium bangladeshense Rashid et al. 2015
 Rhizobium binae Rashid et al. 2015

 Rhizobium calliandrae Rincón-Rosales et al. 2013
 Rhizobium capsici Lin et al. 2015
 Rhizobium cauense Liu et al. 2015
 Rhizobium cellulosilyticum García-Fraile et al. 2007
 Rhizobium changzhiense Zhang et al. 2021
 Rhizobium chutanense Huo et al. 2019

 "Rhizobium cremeum" Yang et al. 2022
 "Rhizobium croatiense" Rajnovic et al. 2022

 "Rhizobium deserti" Liu et al. 2020
 Rhizobium dioscoreae Ouyabe et al. 2020
 Rhizobium ecuadorense Ribeiro et al. 2015

 Rhizobium endophyticum López-López et al. 2010
 Rhizobium esperanzae Cordeiro et al. 2017
 Rhizobium etli Segovia et al. 1993

 Rhizobium favelukesii Torres Tejerizo et al. 2016
 "Rhizobium flavescens" Su et al. 2021

 Rhizobium freirei Dall'Agnol et al. 2013

 Rhizobium gallicum Amarger et al. 1997
 Rhizobium gei Shi et al. 2016

 "Rhizobium glycinendophyticum" Wang et al. 2020
 Rhizobium grahamii López-López et al. 2011
 Rhizobium hainanense Chen et al. 1997
 Rhizobium halophytocola Bibi et al. 2012
 "Rhizobium halotolerans" Diange and Lee 2013
 "Rhizobium hedysari" Casella et al. 1986
 "Rhizobium hedysari" Xu et al. 2017
 "Rhizobium hedysarum" Casella et al. 1984

 Rhizobium helianthi Wei et al. 2015

 Rhizobium hidalgonense Yan et al. 2020

 "Rhizobium indicum" Rahi et al. 2020
 Rhizobium indigoferae Wei et al. 2002

Rhizobium jaguaris Rincón-Rosales et al. 2013

 "Rhizobium kunmingense" Shen et al. 2010
 Rhizobium laguerreae Saïdi et al. 2014

 Rhizobium leguminosarum (Frank 1879) Frank 1889 (Approved Lists 1980)
 Rhizobium lemnae Kittiwongwattana & Thawai 2014
 Rhizobium lentis Rashid et al. 2015
 Rhizobium leucaenae Ribeiro et al. 2011

 Rhizobium lusitanum Valverde et al. 2006

 "Candidatus Rhizobium massiliense" Greub et al. 2004. 
 Rhizobium mayense Rincón-Rosales et al. 2013

 Rhizobium mesoamericanum López-López et al. 2011
 Rhizobium mesosinicum Lin et al. 2009
 Rhizobium metallidurans Grison et al. 2015
 Rhizobium miluonense Gu et al. 2008
 Rhizobium mongolense van Berkum et al. 1998
 Rhizobium multihospitium Han et al. 2008

 Rhizobium oryzicola Zhang et al. 2015
 "Rhizobium oryzihabitans" Zhao et al. 2020

 Rhizobium pakistanense corrig. Khalid et al. 2015

 "Rhizobium panacihumi" Kang et al. 2019
 Rhizobium paranaense Dall'Agnol et al. 2014

 Rhizobium phaseoli Dangeard 1926 (Approved Lists 1980)
 "Rhizobium phenanthrenilyticum" Wen et al. 2011
 Rhizobium pisi Ramírez-Bahena et al. 2008
 "Rhizobium pongamiae" Kesari et al. 2013
 Rhizobium populi Rozahon et al. 2014
 "Rhizobium populisoli" Shen et al. 2021

 Rhizobium puerariae Boonsnongcheep et al. 2016

 "Rhizobium qilianshanense" Xu et al. 2013
 "Rhizobium quercicola" Wang et al. 2022

 "Rhizobium redzepovicii" Rajnovic et al. 2022
 Rhizobium rhizogenes (Riker et al. 1930) Young et al. 2001
 "Rhizobium rhizolycopersici" Thin et al. 2021

 Rhizobium rhizoryzae Zhang et al. 2014

 Rhizobium ruizarguesonis Jorrin et al. 2020

 Rhizobium smilacinae Zhang et al. 2014
 Rhizobium soli Yoon et al. 2010
 Rhizobium sophorae Jiao et al. 2014
 Rhizobium sophoriradicis Jiao et al. 2014

 Rhizobium straminoryzae Lin et al. 2014

 Rhizobium sullae Squartini et al. 2002

 "Rhizobium terrae" Ruan et al. 2020

 Rhizobium tibeticum Hou et al. 2009

 Rhizobium tropici Martínez-Romero et al. 1991
 Rhizobium tubonense Zhang et al. 2011
 Rhizobium tumorigenes Kuzmanović et al. 2019

 Rhizobium vallis Wang et al. 2011

 Rhizobium viscosum (Gasdorf et al. 1965) Flores-Félix et al. 2017

 Rhizobium wenxiniae Gao et al. 2017

 Rhizobium yanglingense Tan et al. 2001

 Rhizobium zeae Celador-Lera et al. 2017

Species in "parentheses" have been described, but not validated according to the Bacteriological Code.

Phylogeny
The currently accepted taxonomy is based on the List of Prokaryotic names with Standing in Nomenclature (LPSN). The phylogeny is based on whole-genome analysis.

Notes

References

External links 
 Current research on Rhizobium leguminosarum at the Norwich Research Park
 Video and commentary on root nodules and Rhizobium in White Clover

Rhizobiaceae
Bacteria genera